John Jones, (1854–1913) known as Coch Bach y Bala was a notorious Welsh criminal. His nickname, Coch Bach y Bala, literally translates as 'Little Redhead of Bala'. He is also known as the Welsh Houdini for having escaped on more than one occasion from Ruthin Gaol.

A habitual criminal, Jones spent over half his life in prison from which he made repeated attempts (some successful) to escape.

His first successful escape was in 1879 when he escaped from Ruthin Gaol while on remand for stealing some watches.  By some method he opened the door of his cell and walked out of the front door of the gaol while the staff were having their evening meal.  He was recaptured three month later near Colwyn Bay.

In 1900 he attempted to escape from Caernarfon Gaol while awaiting transfer to Dartmoor prison.  Barricading himself in his cell he began to tunnel out but was unsuccessful.

Following two lengthy sentences in Dartmoor for burglary, Jones returned to North Wales and within months on his release was convicted of yet another burglary.  Held in Ruthin Gaol while awaiting transfer, this time to Stafford Gaol, he tunnelled through the cell wall and climbed over the prison walls using a rope made from bedclothes.  Six days later while being tracked on land near Llanelidan he was shot in the leg by Reginald Jones-Bateman and bled to death from the wound.

He was buried in the graveyard of St Elidan's Church in Llanelidan, Denbighshire.

Because of his exploits in escaping he was held in some regard by the local population and his funeral was well attended.  His escapades were well reported in the press; describing his last escape the local paper wrote:

References

Llanelidan
British escapees
20th-century Welsh criminals
19th-century Welsh criminals

1854 births
1913 deaths